His First Love (Spanish: Su primer amor) is a 1960 Mexican musical comedy film directed by Juan José Ortega and starring Rafael Bertrand, Tere Velázquez and Freddy Fernández.

Cast
 Rafael Bertrand 
 Tere Velázquez
 Freddy Fernández 
 Anabelle Gutiérrez
 Domingo Soler 
 Conchita Gentil Arcos 
 Magda Donato 
 Antonio Raxel 
 Carlos Amador
 Omar Jasso
 Nora Veryán
 Rosina Navarro 
 Julio Nader 
 Rafael Estrada 
 Jorge Mondragon 
 Ángel Merino

References

Bibliography 
 Emilio García Riera. Historia documental del cine mexicano: 1959-1960. Universidad de Guadalajara, 1994.

External links 
 

1960 films
1960 musical comedy films
Mexican musical comedy films
1960s Spanish-language films
Films directed by Juan José Ortega
1960s Mexican films